Xu Deqing (born July 1963) is a general (shangjiang) of the People's Liberation Army (PLA) serving as political commissar of the Central Theater Command, succeeding Zhu Shengling in January 2022. He is a representative of the 19th National Congress of the Chinese Communist Party.

Biography
Xu was born in Chongqing County (now Chongzhou), Sichuan, in July 1963. In April 2013, he became deputy political commissar of the 13th Group Army, and was promoted to become political commissar of the 47th Group Army in August 2015. He was political commissar of the 71st Group Army in March 2017, and held that office until April 2018, when he was elevated to political commissar of the Western Theater Command Ground Force. In January 2022, he rose to become political commissar of the Central Theater Command, succeeding Zhu Shengling.

He was promoted to the rank of major general (shaojiang) in July 2014, lieutenant general (zhongjiang) in June 2019 and general (shangjiang) in January 2022.

References

1963 births
Living people
People from Chengdu
People's Liberation Army generals from Sichuan
People's Republic of China politicians from Sichuan
Chinese Communist Party politicians from Sichuan